Sde, also sometimes transliterated Sede, is a Hebrew word meaning field and may refer to the following places:

 Sde Boaz
 Sde Boker
 Sde David
 Sde Eliezer
 Sde Eliyahu
 Sde Ilan
 Sde Moshe
 Sde Nahum
 Sde Nehemia
 Sde Nitzan
 Sde Trumot
 Sde Tzvi
 Sde Uziyahu
 Sde Warburg
 Sde Ya'akov
 Sde Yitzhak
 Sde Yoav

See also
 SDE (disambiguation)
 Sede (disambiguation)